is a railway station in Miyagino-ku in Sendai, Miyagi, Japan operated by East Japan Railway Company (JR East).

Lines
Kozurushinden Station is served by the Senseki Line.

Station layout
The station has two opposed side platforms with the station building located above the platforms. The station has a Midori no Madoguchi staffed ticket office.

Platforms

History
Kozurushinden Station opened on March 13, 2004.

Passenger statistics
In fiscal 2018, the station was used by an average of 6,286 passengers daily (boarding passengers only).

Surrounding area
The area surrounding the station is mainly residential with many newly (~2008) constructed apartment buildings. There is a Coca-Cola factory located nearby.

See also
 List of railway stations in Japan

References

External links

  

Railway stations in Sendai
Senseki Line
Railway stations in Japan opened in 2004
Stations of East Japan Railway Company